The 2017 World Under-17 Hockey Challenge was an ice hockey tournament held in Dawson Creek and Fort St. John, British Columbia, Canada between November 5 and 11.  The World Under-17 Hockey Challenge is held by Hockey Canada annually to showcase young hockey talent from across Canada and other strong hockey countries.

Challenge results

Preliminary round

Group A

Results

Group B

Play Offs

Final standings

External links
Official Website

U-17
U-17
U-17
U-17
U-17
U-17
World U-17 Hockey Challenge
Ice hockey in British Columbia